Hippolyte Castille (8 November 1820, Montreuil-sur-Mer – 26 September 1886, Luc-sur-Mer) was a French writer and polemicist.

Castille wrote in collaboration with Frédéric Bastiat and Gustave de Molinari. Among his works are the Portraits historiques du dix-neuvième siècle, with portraits of the likes of Chateaubriand, Baroche and Lamartine, among many others. He also wrote about Napoleon III.

Publications 
 Le Dernier Banquet de la bourgeoisie, 1849
 La Place publique, 1849
 Les Ambitieux, 1851
 Les Oiseaux de proie, 1851
 L'Ascalante, 1852
 Les Hommes et les Mœurs en France sous le règne de Louis-Philippe, 1853
 La Chasse aux chimères. Le Dernier des Starle, 1854
 Histoire de la seconde République française, 4 vol., 1854-1856
 Histoires de ménage, scènes de la vie réelle, 1856
 Portraits politiques au dix-neuvième siècle, 80 fasc., 1857-1862
 Première série:
1. Napoléon III. 2. Alexandre II. 3. Le Général Cavaignac. 4. La Duchesse d'Orléans. 5. Le Marquis Delcanetto. 6. Drouyn de Lhuys. 7. Ledru-Rollin. 8. Lord Palmerston. 9. Le Comte de Montalembert. 10. Louis Blanc. 11. Louis Blanc. 12. Saint-Arnauld et Canrobert. 13. Michelet. 14. Espartero et O'Donnel. 15. Victor Hugo. 16. Le prince de Talleyrand. 17. L.-A. Blanqui. 18. Le Prince de Metternich. 19. Louis Philippe. 20. Le Comte de Persigny. 20 bis. Frédéric Guillaume IV. 21. Lamennais. 22. Le Comte de Chambord. 23. M. Guizot. 24. Mme de Stael. 25. Le Général Changarnier. 26. Benjamin Constant. 27. Le Prince Alexandre Ghika IX, caïmacan de Valachie, et Nicolas Conaki Vogoridès, caïmacan de Moldavie. 28. Chateaubriand. 29. Béranger. 30. M. Thiers. 31. Armand Carrel. - 1857. 32. M. de Lamartine. 33. Réchid-Pacha. 34. Paul-Louis Courier. 35. La Duchesse de Berry. 37. Napoléon Ier. 38. Le Général de Lamoricière. 39. Jules Favre. 40. Pie IX. 41. E. de Girardin. 42. P.-J. Proudhon. 43. Lafayette. 44. Victoria. 45. Edgard Quinet. 46. Casimir Perier. 47. Oscar Ier, roi de Suède. 48. Les Journaux et les journalistes sous l'Empire et sous la Restauration. 49. Les Journaux et les journalistes sous le règne de Louis Philippe. 50. Les Journaux et les journalistes depuis 1848 jusqu'à aujourd'hui.
 Deuxième série:
1. Le Maréchal Pélissier, duc de Malakoff. 2. Le Père Enfantin. 3. Le Prince Napoléon-Bonaparte. 4. Les Princes de la famille d'Orléans, le prince de Joinville et le duc d'Aumale. 5. M. Berryer. 6. M. de Morny. 7. M. Villemain. 8. Le Maréchal Bosquet. 9. Ferdinand II, roi de Naples. 10. Le Comte de Cavour. 11. Les chefs de corps de l'armée d'Italie. 12. Garibaldi. 13. Louis Kossuth. 14. Victor Emmanuel II. 15. L'Impératrice Eugénie. 16. Jérôme Bonaparte. 17. M. Baroche. 18. M. Mocquard. 19. Mazzini. 20. François-Joseph, empereur d'Autriche. 21. Léopold, roi des Belges. 22. Mgr Dupanloup, évêque d'Orléans. 23. Le Vicomte de la Guéronnière. 24. M. Achille Fould. 25. M. Rouland. 26. Le Cardinal Antonelli. 27. Le Général de Pimodan. 28. Les Frères Pereire. 29. Le Père Félix. 30. M. Ratazzi.
 Parallèle entre César, Charlemagne et Napoléon : L'Empire et la démocratie, philosophie de la légende impériale, 1858
 Aventures imaginaires, 1858
 Blanche d'Orbe, précédé d'un essai sur Clarisse Harlowe et La Nouvelle Héloïse, 2 vol., 1859
 L'Excommunication, 1860
 Le Pape et l'Encyclique, 1860
 Napoléon III et le clergé, 1860
 La Quatrième Dynastie, 1861
 Histoire de la Révolution française, 4 vol., 1863
 1. États Généraux. 2. Constituante. 3. Convention. 4. Directoire 1788-1800.
 Les Massacres de juin 1848, 1869
 Lettres de Paris, 2 vol., 1873
 Les Compagnons de la mort. Espérance, s. d.
 Le Contrebandier, s. d.
 Le Markgrave. Le Secret d'une jeune fille, s. d.

External links 
 
 
  Gallica for some of Castille's works

1820 births
1886 deaths
People from Montreuil, Pas-de-Calais
French republicans
19th-century French writers
Writers from Hauts-de-France
French male writers
19th-century French male writers